Ivan Shanhin (19 August 1955) is a former professional Soviet football defender and coach.

References

External links
 
 Hadzheha, V. Ivan Shanhin: "My mom shooed me away from training, but I anyway became a footballer" (Іван ШАНГІН: «Мене мама з тренувань проганяла, а я все одно став футболістом»). Ukrayinskyi futbol.

1955 births
Living people
Sportspeople from Uzhhorod
Soviet footballers
Ukrainian footballers
SC Lutsk players
FC Hoverla Uzhhorod players
FC Metalurh Zaporizhzhia players
Ukrainian football managers
FC Hoverla Uzhhorod managers
FC Polissya Zhytomyr managers
Association football defenders